Gulliver's Travels is a book by Jonathan Swift.

Gulliver's Travels may also refer to:
 Gulliver's Travels Among the Lilliputians and the Giants, a 1902 French silent film directed by Georges Méliès
 Gulliver's Travels (1924 film), a 1924 Austrian silent adventure film
 The New Gulliver, a 1935 Soviet film
 Gulliver's Travels (1939 film), an animated film
 Gulliver's Travels (1977 film), starring Richard Harris
 Saban's Gulliver's Travels, a 1992 TV series
 Gulliver's Travels, a 1996 animated film by Golden Films
 Gulliver's Travels (miniseries), a 1996 film starring Ted Danson
 Gulliver's Travels (2010 film), starring Jack Black
 Gulliver's Travels, a 1999 radio adaptation in the Radio Tales series

See also
 Brian Gulliver's Travels, a satirical radio series starring Neil Pearson
 Gulliver's Travels Beyond the Moon
 Gulliver's Travels#Adaptations
 The 3 Worlds of Gulliver, a 1960 film loosely based on the novel, also known as Gulliver's Travels